Glenn Rand (born in 1944 Cincinnati, Ohio, United States) is an American photographic artist, educator and writer. He has produced photographic art that has been included in public museum collections throughout the United States, Japan, and Europe.  He has written twelve books on photography and contributed regularly to magazines. In 2009 the Photo Imaging Education Association (PIEA) presented him with its "Excellence in Education Award" for his insightful contributions to photographic education.

Higher education
After receiving his Bachelor of Arts degree at Purdue University in 1966 with a Major in Humanities and Design, Rand continued at Purdue, acquiring a  Master of Art in Industrial and Environmental Design in 1968. During his studies at Purdue, he became involved in Fine-art photography, studying with Vernon Cheek. He  received a  High School Teaching Certificate in 1975 at Edgecliff College, and a Doctor of Education in 1978 at the University of Cincinnati. He did post-doctoral study and research as a visiting scholar at the University of Michigan.

Teaching
Rand's 50-year teaching career started in 1966 while pursuing graduate work. Rand has taught in public education, community colleges and universities. Major teaching or administrative positions include  Purdue University(1966-1972), Colorado Mountain College (1975-1980), Lansing Community College (1980-2000) and Brooks Institute (2001-2012). During his career, he has created and/or redesigned curricula for multiple forms of art such as fine art photography, commercial photography, digital imaging, crafts and allied curricula.

Works
Rand is known for his traditional silver gelatin prints and digital fine-art photography. His fine-art photography has been acquired into over 30 permanent collections and has been exhibited throughout the United States and abroad.

He has worked professionally, specializing in table-top illustration primarily for editorial content. Rand has also consulted with corporate and educational clients, including the Eastman Kodak Company, the Ford Motor Company, the Photo Marketing Association International, the Ministry of Education of Finland, other businesses and several colleges.

Works in permanent collections
A selected list of the more than 30 permanent collections that include Rand's work:
Center For Creative Photography
Cincinnati Art Museum
Crocker Museum of Art
Dayton Art Institute
Denver Art Museum
Finnish Museum of Photography
High Museum of Art
Museum of Fine Art - Houston
Santa Barbara Museum of Art

Published works

References

American photographers
Living people
University of Michigan fellows
1944 births